The Geroldsbach is a river of Tyrol, Austria.

It flows through Götzens where it changes its direction to northeast and passes through the district Neu-Götzens. It flows further through , a district of Innsbruck. Finally, it discharges in the district  of Innsbruck into the Inn. The Geroldsbach has a length of  whereof  lie in the Innsbruck city area.

The Geroldsbach provides four water reservoirs for the region Götzens and two in Wilten with drinking water, which is mainly used for supplying the prisons Innsbruck and Sieglanger. As a result, the lower course carries slightly less water; it retains Grade A water quality throughout its entire course.

In the event of flooding or heavy rainfall, the river proved to be a danger several times, so it was straightened in places in the local areas.

References

Rivers of Tyrol (state)
Rivers of Austria